Cherskii's sculpin (Cottus czerskii) is a species of fish in the family Cottidae. It is found in rivers flowing into the Sea of Japan from Primorsky Krai to Korea. It reaches a maximum length of 19.5 cm.

References

Cottus (fish)
Fish described in 1913
Taxa named by Lev Berg